This is a list of the main career statistics of professional American tennis player Danielle Collins.

Performance timelines

Only main-draw results in WTA Tour, Grand Slam tournaments, Fed Cup/Billie Jean King Cup and Olympic Games are included in win–loss records.

Singles
Current through the 2023 Indian Wells Open.

Doubles
Current through the 2023 Indian Wells Open.

Grand Slam tournament finals

Singles: 1 (1 runner-up)

WTA career finals

Singles: 3 (2 titles, 1 runner-up)

WTA Challenger finals

Singles: 1 (1 title)

ITF Circuit finals

Singles: 8 (4 titles, 4 runner–ups)

Doubles: 2 (2 runner–ups)

WTA Tour career earnings
Current through the 2022 Budapest Grand Prix.

Career Grand Slam statistics

Grand Slam seedings
The tournaments won by Collins are in boldface, and advanced into finals by Collins are in italics.

Best Grand Slam results details 
Grand Slam winners are in boldface, and runners-up are in italics.

Head-to-head records

Record against top 10 players

Collins's record against players who have been ranked in the top 10. Active players are in boldface.

No. 1 wins

Top 10 wins

Notes

References 

Collins, Danielle